George Fitz-Hardinge Berkeley (29 January 1870 – 14 November 1955) was an Anglo-Irish soldier, public servant, cricketer, and author.

Personal life
George Fitz-Hardinge Berkeley was born in 1870, the only child of George Sackville Berkeley, a major in the Royal Engineers. He was educated at Wellington College and Keble College, Oxford. He later practised at the Irish Bar. In 1899 he married Caroline Isabel Mason. He moved to Italy in 1920 for the good of his wife's health; she died in 1933. The following year he married Janet Margaret Mary Weld, with whom he co-wrote a history of Italian unification. He was a member of two gentlemen's clubs: Vincent's in Oxford and the Kildare Street Club in Dublin. He died at his home, Hanwell Castle, near Banbury, Oxfordshire.

Public life
Berkeley served in the Worcestershire Regiment from 1898 to 1901. He supported Irish Home Rule and the Irish Volunteers, and at a 1914 meeting in Alice Stopford Green's London home he subscribed the largest amount to the arms purchase fund which resulted in the Howth gun-running. In the First World War he was a brigade musketry officer with the 3rd Cavalry reserve. After the war he was a member of the Claims Commission in France and Italy. In 1920 he was active in the Irish Dominion League, which proposed Dominion status for Ireland, and with the Peace with Ireland Council, of British public figures opposed to the government's waging of the Anglo-Irish War. In 1954 he submitted two papers to the Irish Bureau of Military History relating to his 1914 and 1920 activities. He was a magistrate in Oxfordshire from 1906 to 1937.

Cricket career

Berkeley played for Oxford University Cricket Club in the 1890s. A left-arm medium pace bowler, he took 131 wickets in 32 first-class appearances at an average of 20.75. He best bowling performance occurred on his debut, when he took eight wickets for Oxford University in the first innings against the touring Australians. Berkeley was awarded his blue, appearing against Cambridge in the University match, in each of his four years at Oxford. He was Oxford's leading wicket-taker during his first three years at the university, but in the third, he was unable to play in all the matches, but maintained a strong bowling average. He played twice for Ireland, taking 11 for 75 against I Zingari in Phoenix Park in 1890. He later played minor counties cricket for Oxfordshire between 1904 and 1906.

Publications
 
 
 
  (with Joan Berkeley; 3 volumes)

References

1870 births
1955 deaths
Irish Dominion League
Historians of Italy
Irish barristers
Cricketers from County Dublin
People educated at Wellington College, Berkshire
Alumni of Keble College, Oxford
Oxford University cricketers
Irish cricketers
Gentlemen cricketers
Gentlemen of England cricketers
Oxfordshire cricketers
Oxford and Cambridge Universities cricketers
Irish expatriates in Italy
H. D. G. Leveson Gower's XI cricketers
Oxford University Past and Present cricketers